In April and May 2012, large trading losses occurred at JPMorgan's Chief Investment Office, based on transactions booked through its London branch. The unit was run by Chief Investment Officer Ina Drew, who later stepped down. A series of derivative transactions involving credit default swaps (CDS) were entered, reportedly as part of the bank's "hedging" strategy. Trader Bruno Iksil, nicknamed the London Whale, accumulated outsized CDS positions in the market. An estimated trading loss of $2 billion was announced. However, the loss amounted to more than $6 billion for JP Morgan Chase.

These events gave rise to a number of investigations to examine the firm's risk management systems and internal controls. JPMorgan Chase agreed to pay $920 million in fines. JPMorgan Chase cut chief executive Jamie Dimon's 2012 pay in half, to $11.5 million from $23 million, due to the $6 billion trading loss.

Background
In February 2012, hedge fund insiders such as Boaz Weinstein of Saba Capital Management became aware that the market in credit default swaps was possibly being affected by aggressive trading activities. The source of the unusual activity turned out to be Bruno Iksil, a trader for JPMorgan Chase & Co. Market-moving trades by the bank's Chief Investment Office had first been uncovered in June 2011 by Dan Alderson, a reporter at trade journal Creditflux, which reported on anomalies in CDX HY index tranche pricing dynamics caused by Iksil's trading activity. The same journal reported on further tranche trading activity by the JP Morgan unit two months later. By 2012, heavy opposing bets to his positions had been made by traders, including another branch of JPMorgan, who purchased the derivatives that JPMorgan was selling in high volume. JPMorgan denied the first news reports, with Chairman and CEO Jamie Dimon calling it a "tempest in a teapot." Major losses of $2 billion were reported by the firm in May 2012 in relation to these trades.

On July 13, 2012, the total loss was updated to $5.8 billion with the addition of a $4.4 billion loss in the second quarter and subsequent recalculation of a loss of $1.4 billion for the first quarter. A spokesman for the firm claimed that projected total losses could be more than $7 billion. The disclosure, which resulted in headlines in the media, did not disclose the exact nature of the trading involved, which remained in progress as of May 16, 2012, as JPMorgan's losses mounted and other traders sought to profit or avoid losses resulting from JPMorgan's positions. As of June 28, 2012, JPMorgan's positions were continuing to produce losses which could total as much as $9 billion under worst-case scenarios. The trades were possibly related to CDX IG 9, a credit default swap index based on the default risk of major U.S. corporations that has been described as a "derivative of a derivative". On the company's emergency conference call, JPMorgan Chase Chairman and CEO Jamie Dimon said the strategy was "flawed, complex, poorly reviewed, poorly executed, and poorly monitored".  The episode is being investigated by the Federal Reserve, the SEC, and the FBI.

Trades
On February 2, 2012, at the Harbor Investment Conference, speaking to an audience of investors, Boaz Weinstein recommended buying the Markit CDX North America Investment Grade Series 9 10-Year Index, CDX IG 9. This contract was a standardized credit derivative contract with an initial 10y maturity, maturing on 20th December 2017.  The price of the CDX IG index reflects the credit risk of an underlying basket of North American investment-grade companies. Weinstein had noticed this contract was an unusually cheap way to buy credit protection relative to other more liquid indices. It turned out that JPMorgan was shorting the index by making huge trades. JPMorgan's bet was that credit markets would strengthen; the index is based on 121 investment grade bonds issued by North American corporations. Investors who followed Weinstein's tip did poorly during the early months of 2012 as JPMorgan strongly supported its position. However, by May, after investors became concerned about the implications of the European financial crisis, the situation reversed and JPMorgan suffered large losses. In addition to Weinstein's Saba Capital Management, Blue Mountain Capital, BlueCrest Capital, Lucidus Capital Partners, CQS, III, and Hutchin Hill are hedge funds which are known to have benefited from taking the other side of the trade to JPMorgan. A separate unit of JPMorgan was also on the winning side.

The $6.2 billion loss came from three positions that partially offset one another. It occurred when the world's financial markets were in relative calm. Had quality spread curves twisted or worldwide economic distress been more pronounced the loss could have been much higher.

The Financial Times "Alphaville" analysis suggests that these positions were not volatile enough to account for the full losses reported. They suggest that other positions are likely involved as well.

Investigation
The internal investigation concluded in July 2012. It involved more than 1,000 people across the firm and outside law firm WilmerHale.  A report issued in January 2013 made the following "key observations" 
"CIO [Chief Investment Office] judgment, execution and escalation in the First Quarter of 2012 were poor"
"The Firm did not ensure that the controls and oversight of CIO evolved commensurately with the increased complexity and risks of certain CIO activities"
"CIO risk management was ineffective in dealing with synthetic credit portfolio"
"Risk limits for CIO were not sufficiently granular"
"Approval and implementation of CIO Synthetic Credit VaR Model were inadequate"

In July 2017, U.S. prosecutors dropped criminal charges against two derivative traders from France and Spain after unsuccessful efforts to extradite them from their countries.

JPM organizational structure, risk systems, accounting and internal control

The trades occurred within the Chief Investment Office (CIO), where staff were reportedly "faithfully executing strategies demanded by the bank's risk management model". This unit is reported to have very wide latitude in otherwise unsupervised trading. The company had been without a treasurer for five months during the time of the trades and had a relatively inexperienced executive, Irvin Goldman, in charge of risk management in the CIO.

The trades took place in a unit of JPMorgan that reported directly to Chairman & CEO Jamie Dimon. In Congressional testimony it came out that Dimon wanted to be responsible for what information was revealed, and information was withheld from the regulators. There had been a series of violations of the Sarbanes–Oxley regulations requiring certain protections.

On May 10, 2012, Dimon announced that there was a loss of at least $2 billion through "egregious mistakes" in trading.

Impact on Volcker Rule implementation

The Volcker Rule, part of the Dodd–Frank Wall Street Reform and Consumer Protection Act, bans high-risk trading inside commercial banking and lending institutions.  The Volcker rule is sometimes referred to as "a modern Glass-Steagall firewall that separates core banking system from higher-risk, hedge fund-style proprietary trading".  The rule's implementation had been repeatedly delayed however, with analysts predicting implementation in 2014 and lobbyists simultaneously pushing to delay it longer. The final version of the Volcker Rule was passed on December 10, 2013, which was implemented in July 2015.

Lobby efforts and government relations
Bloomberg News and Robert Schmidt identified several people at JPM involved in the lobbying and its government relations response.

See also

 List of trading losses
 Proprietary trading
 Rogue trader
 Speculation
 Swap (finance)

References and sources
References

Sources
https://web.archive.org/web/20130412010440/http://investor.shareholder.com/jpmorganchase/events-files.cfm
Further reading

External links
JP Morgan Chase Whale Trades: A Case History of Derivatives Risks and Abuses: Hearing before the Permanent Subcommittee on Investigations of the Committee on Homeland Security and Governmental Affairs, United States Senate, One Hundred Thirteenth Congress, First Session, March 15, 2013, Vol. 1 Vol. 2

2012 in economics
Derivatives (finance)
Rogue traders
Separation of investment and retail banking
Banking controversies